The 2009 season is Canberra United's second season of football (soccer) in Australia competing in the W-League 2009 season.

Fixtures
The 2009 season will be played over 10 rounds, followed by a finals series. A rematch of the grand final between Canberra and Queensland Roar served as the season's opener. Just four players that started the grand final nine months earlier remained for Canberra, and were outplayed by a Roar team that retained much of their championship winning squad for the second season.

 In the Round 5 match, Central Coast are the nominated home team, with the W-League match to be played as a curtain raiser to a men's A-League match.

Standings

Players
Players confirmed for 2009 season:

In
 Kahlia Hogg (ACTAS)
 Ellie Raymond (ACTAS)
 Emily van Egmond (Newcastle Jets)
 Lin Chiung-ying (National Taiwan College of Physical Education)
 Tseng Shu-o (National Taiwan Normal University)
 Ellyse Perry (Central Coast Mariners)
 Sally Shipard (unattached)
 Jocelyn Mara (Belconnen United FC)

Out
 Caitlin Munoz – Assistant Coach (non-playing; knee operation)
 Amy Chapman (released / knee operation)
 Kara Mowbray (Melbourne Victory)
 Sasha McDonnell (Brisbane Roar)
 Maja Blasch (released)
 Rhian Davies (released)
 Thea Slatyer (released)
 Lucy Allan (released)
 Hayley Crawford (released)

Leading scorers

The leading goal scorers from the regular season.

Squad statistics
Last updated 10 October 2009

References

2009
Canberra United